This is a list of Surinamese football clubs in international competitions. Surinamese clubs have participated in competitive international soccer competitions since at least 1968, when Transvaal entered the 1968 CONCACAF Champions' Cup.

Despite being geographically part of South America, Suriname has played in international competitions in CONCACAF due to cultural ties to the Caribbean.

Results by competition

CONCACAF Champions Cup / Champions League

CONCACAF League

CONCACAF Cup Winners Cup / Giants Cup

CFU Club Championship

CFU Club Shield

Paramaribo Cup 
The Paramaribo Cup was a series of friendly matches held in Paramaribo between select Surinamese and Brazilian clubs.

Parbo Bier Cup

Appearances in CONCACAF competitions

References

External links 
 RSSSF International Club Results for North America
Suriname - List of Champions, RSSSF.com

 
North American football clubs in international competitions